Meditations is the thirteenth studio album by Canadian death metal band Kataklysm. The album was produced by the band's guitarist and drummer, Jean-François Dagenais and Oli Beaudoin respectably, and mixed by Jay Ruston, who helmed Anthrax and Stone Sour's latest records. Paul Logus mastered the album. The album was released on June 1, 2018. The band released a lyric video of the single 'Guillotine' on March 30, 2018, and another for the song 'Narcissist' on May 5, 2018. Singer Maurizio Iacono commented to Blabbermouth:

Reception

The album has received positive reviews by critics. Metal Injection gave the album 7.5/10. Dom Lawson of Metal Hammer gave the album 3.5/5 stars in his review. Distorted Sound Magazine gave the album 9/10 in their reviews.

Track listing
All tracks written by the band:

Credits 
Personnel
Maurizio Iacono - vocals
J-F Dagenais - lead, rhythm and all guitars
Stéphane Barbe - bass guitar
Oli Beaudoin - drums, percussion

Guest Session
Francis Bouillon - samples

Production
Jay Ruston - mixing
Paul Logus - mastering
J-F Dagenais - engineering
Oli Beaudoin - engineering
Ocvlta Designs by Surtsey - cover artwork, design and layouts

References

2018 albums
Kataklysm albums
Nuclear Blast albums